Bruce Richmond may refer to:

 Bruce Lyttelton Richmond (1871–1964), British editor and journalist
 L. Bruce Richmond (1920–2008), American politician in the Illinois House of Representatives